Ulrika Tülp (born 20 June 1991) is an Estonian footballer who plays as a forward and has appeared for the Estonia women's national team.

Career
Tülp has been capped for the Estonia national team, appearing for the team during the 2019 FIFA Women's World Cup qualifying cycle.

References

External links
 
 
 
 
 

1991 births
Living people
Sportspeople from Haapsalu
Estonian women's footballers
Estonia women's international footballers
Women's association football forwards
Pärnu JK players
21st-century Estonian women